Orlando is the historic estate of William M. Wood Jr. in Andover, Massachusetts. Wood's father, William Madison Wood, was president and part owner of the American Woolen Company, whose home was the Arden estate next door to where Orlando was built. William M. Wood Jr.'s mother was Ellen Ayer Wood, the daughter of Frederick Ayer. Orlando is a distinctive Spanish Mission style mansion of 2.5 stories, with a green tile roof. The house was a wedding gift to Wood and his new wife, Edith Goldsborough Robinson, from his parents. The house was begun in 1916 and completed in 1917 to a design by architect Perley F. Gilbert, an Andover native who was then practicing in Lowell. The house's locally unusual Spanish Colonial-inspired architecture may have been influenced by the Wood family's summers in Florida.

Located at 260 N. Main Street, it now houses the private Lanam Club.

The house was listed on the National Register of Historic Places in 1982.

See also
National Register of Historic Places listings in Andover, Massachusetts
National Register of Historic Places listings in Essex County, Massachusetts

External links
Lanam Club Home Page

References

Houses in Andover, Massachusetts
National Register of Historic Places in Andover, Massachusetts
Houses completed in 1915
1915 establishments in Massachusetts
Houses on the National Register of Historic Places in Essex County, Massachusetts